Michael Rohde may refer to:

Michael Rohde (chess player) (born 1959), American chess grandmaster
Michael Rohde (footballer) (1894-1979), Danish football player
Michael Rohde (botanist) (1782-1812), German botanist